David Charles Lindberg (November 15, 1935 – January 6, 2015) was an American historian of science. His main focus was in the history of medieval and early modern science, especially physical science and the relationship between religion and science. Lindberg was the author or editor of many books and received numerous grants and awards. He also served as president of the History of Science Society and in 1999 was recipient of its Sarton medal.

Early life and education 
Lindberg was born on November 15, 1935, in Minneapolis, Minnesota. He would go on to obtain a degree in physics from Northwestern University and a Ph.D. in history and philosophy of science from Indiana University.

Biography 
Lindberg was the Hilldale Professor Emeritus of History of Science and past director of the Institute for Research in the Humanities, at the University of Wisconsin–Madison. Lindberg was the author or editor of more than a dozen books, received grants and awards from organizations that included the John Simon Guggenheim Memorial Foundation, the National Science Foundation, the National Endowment for the Humanities, the Institute for Advanced Study in Princeton, New Jersey, the History of Science Society, the Medieval Academy of America, and the University of Wisconsin–Madison. With Ronald Numbers, he co-edited two anthologies on the relationship between religion and science. Also with Numbers, Lindberg was general editor of the eight-volume Cambridge History of Science and with Michael Shank editor of its volume on medieval science. He served as president of the History of Science Society and was awarded its highest prize for lifetime scholarly achievement: the Sarton medal.

Selected publications 
 John Pecham and the Science of Optics: Perspectiva Communis (1970) 
 Theories of Vision from al-Kindi to Kepler (1976) ASIN B000OPS4RC; (1996) 
 Science in the Middle Ages (1978) 
 Studies in the History of Medieval Optics (1983) 
 Roger Bacon's Philosophy of Nature (1983) ; (1997) 
 The Genesis of Kepler's Theory of Light: Light Metaphysics from Plotinus to Kepler (1976) ASIN B00073BMM0
 God and Nature (editor, with Ronald Numbers) (1986) 
 Reappraisals of the Scientific Revolution (editor, with Robert S. Westman) (1990) 
 The Beginnings of Western Science, 600 B.C. to A.D. 1450 (1992) 
 Roger Bacon and the Origins of Perspectiva in the Middle Ages (1996) 
 When Science and Christianity Meet (editor, with Ronald Numbers) (2003)

References

External links 
 Archived academic homepage
 Beyond War and Peace: A Reappraisal of the Encounter between Christianity and Science
 Obituary

Northwestern University alumni
Indiana University alumni
University of Wisconsin–Madison faculty
American historians of religion
Historians of science
Writers from Indiana
Historians from Indiana
Historians from Illinois
Historians from Wisconsin
1935 births
2015 deaths
Fellows of the Medieval Academy of America